Alexander Kelso Davis was an American politician. He was a member of the Mississippi House of Representatives and Lieutenant Governor of Mississippi. He was impeached by the resurgent Democrats towards the end of the Reconstruction era in 1876. He was the first African American to serve as lieutenant governor in Mississippi.

He was a lawyer from Tennessee. He came to Mississippi in 1869 and lived in Noxubee County. He served in the Mississippi House of Representatives from 1870 until 1873. He served as Lieutenant Governor of Mississippi from 1874, succeeding Ridgley C. Powers, and served until he resigned as he faced impeachment in 1876. Resurgent Democrats took back control and impeached him to prevent him becoming governor once they removed Governor Adelbert Ames. He left politics and became a pastor where he served until his death in 1884.

See also
 African-American officeholders during and following the Reconstruction era
 List of lieutenant governors of Mississippi
 List of minority governors and lieutenant governors in the United States

References

Year of birth missing
19th-century American politicians
Tennessee lawyers
1884 deaths
Lieutenant Governors of Mississippi
African-American state legislators in Mississippi
Republican Party members of the Mississippi House of Representatives
People from Noxubee County, Mississippi
19th-century American lawyers
Mississippi politicians convicted of crimes